Adam Reed is the name of:

 Adam Reed (born 1970), American voice actor
 Adam Reed (footballer, born 1975), English footballer
 Adam Reed (footballer, born 1991), English footballer

See also
Adam Reid, Canadian actor
Adam Reid (filmmaker), American filmmaker
Adam le Rede (fl.1301), MP for Derby